Marjorie Cotton Isherwood, best known by the name Marjorie Cotton (1913–2003), was the first professionally qualified children's librarian in New South Wales, Australia. She initiated programs that are the basis of services to children in Australian public libraries today.

Contributions to children's librarianship

Marjorie Cotton pioneered many of the services now associated with children's librarianship in Australia, including weekly story sessions, contact and collaboration with schools, providing material for children in languages other than English and appointing qualified children's librarians.

Her influence reached far beyond the Ku-ring-gai, Newcastle, Randwick and Woollahra libraries in which she worked. She was the first president of the Library Association of Australia Children's Libraries Section in 1953. Marjorie worked with Bess Thomas conducting the first Australian course in Children’s Librarianship at Mosman Municipal Library, which was attended by librarians from four states in 1954.

Raising the standard of Australian children's literature

Marjorie acted as a judge on the Children’s Book Council of Australia Award panel several times.  In this capacity she worked hard to raise the standard of Australian picture books.  She contributed some additional chapters to Maurice Saxby's original survey of the history of Australian children's literature. Marjorie’s contribution to Australian children’s literature also includes persuading Desmond Digley to illustrate the well-loved Australian poem Waltzing Matilda by A.B. Paterson, which won the Australian Children's Book of the Year Award in 1971.

Recognition
Marjorie Cotton's expertise was recognized by overseas organizations such as UNESCO, who sought her advice on children's library services in 1955 requesting that she prepare a paper for a seminar to be held in Delhi on the subject of “Stimulating Children’s Reading”. 800 delegates assembled at Parliament House where Prime Minister Nehru gave the opening address. Of the 46 presenters, only one was a woman.

The Marjorie Cotton Award

A biennial award  was established in Marjorie’s memory by the Australian Library and Information Association. The Award strives to:

 promote the role and image of librarians providing library services for young people
 recognize individual achievement and co-operative networking in providing services for young people in public libraries and school libraries
 encourage children's and youth services librarians and teacher librarians to actively support the profession and the Association

Past recipients of the Marjorie Cotton Award

 Melinda McNaughton (2008) Sutherland Shire Libraries
 Carolyn Bourke (2006), Fairfield City Library Service
 Joanne Oliver (2004), Camden Library Service
 Sarah Steed (2000), Parramatta Library
 Narelle Poulton (1998), Central Northern Libraries: Tamworth
 Heather Fisher (1996), Gosford City Library

Images
A portrait of Marjorie Cotton, painted by Jean Isherwood, is held in Australia's National Portrait Gallery. A number of photographs of Marjorie Cotton are held in the Woollahra Library Local History Centre collection, highlighting the years Marjorie spent working there.

Bibliography
 Printed for private circulation.

 With supplementary chapters by Marjorie Cotton.

External links
 Australian Library and Information Association (ALIA)
 ALIA's biography of Marjorie Cotton, including photographs
 The Marjorie Cotton Award
 Children’s Book Council of Australia
 Australian Children's Book of the Year Award

References

1913 births
2003 deaths
Australian Library and Information Association
Australian librarians
Australian women librarians
People from New South Wales
Place of birth missing
Place of death missing